Lake Buchanan or Buchanan Lake may refer to the following:
Buchanan Lake (Minnesota)
Lake Buchanan (Texas)
Lake Buchanan (Queensland)
Lake Buchanan (Western Australia)
Lake Buchanan (Nunavut)/Buchanan Lake (Nunavut)
Buchanan Lake (Nova Scotia)